Marita á Fríðriksmørk (born 12 August 1996) is a Faroese footballer who plays as a midfielder for Víkingur and the Faroe Islands women's national team.

Club career
Fríðriksmørk has played for Skála, EBS/Skála, ÍF/Víkingur, ÍVB and Víkingur in the Faroe Islands.

International career
Fríðriksmørk capped for Faroe Islands at senior level during the UEFA Women's Euro 2022 qualifying.

References

External links

1996 births
Living people
Faroese women's footballers
Women's association football midfielders
Faroe Islands women's international footballers